Felipe Araruna Hoffmann (born 12 March 1996), known as Felipe Araruna, is a Brazilian professional footballer. Mainly a defensive midfielder, he can also play as a right-back.

Career 
In December 2016, Felipe Araruna, of the U-20 multi-player team, caught the attention of Rogério Ceni and was promoted to the professional team of São Paulo FC.

Reading
On 30 January 2020, Araruna signed for EFL Championship club Reading on a contract until the summer of 2022.

During Reading's FA Cup tie against Kidderminster Harriers on 8 January 2022, Araruna came on as a 59th minute substitute for Dejan Tetek, dislocating his knee in the first passage of play after his substitution and had to be replaced by Michael Stickland. On 20 May 2022, Reading confirmed that Araruna would leave the club upon the expiration of his contract.

Career statistics

Honours
Fortaleza
Campeonato Cearense: 2019

References

External links
Felipe Araruna at playmakerstats.com (English version of ogol.com.br)

1996 births
Living people
Brazilian footballers
Brazil under-20 international footballers
Brazil youth international footballers
Campeonato Brasileiro Série A players
São Paulo FC players
Fortaleza Esporte Clube players
Footballers from Porto Alegre
Reading F.C. players
Association football midfielders
English Football League players